Aksel Vilhelmsson Johannesen (born 8 November 1972 in Klaksvík, Faroe Islands) is a Faroese lawyer and politician for the Social Democratic Party (Javnaðarflokkurin) and the current  prime minister of the Faroe Islands and also served as prime minister from 2015 to 2019. He is a former footballer.

Political career 
At the 2008 Faroese general election Aksel Johannesen was the party's 1st suppleant to the Løgting (Faroese Parliament), and sometimes he took seat in the parliament, especially for Andrias Petersen. He became minister of health on 16 July 2009, when John Johannessen declined the minister position after Hans Pauli Strøm stepped down. He resigned as minister of health and was assigned as minister of finance on 21 February and was at the same time elected president of the Social Democratic Party (Javnaðarflokkurin) on 5 March 2011. On 6 April the same year, he was appointed as vice prime minister. His main task as the president of the Social Democratic Party was to make the party rise to its former strength again for the upcoming election for the Løgting. On 14 November 2011 the cabinet was renewed and the Social Democratic Party was not a part of the new cabinet. Aksel Johannesen then became chairman of the Social Democratic Party on the Løgting.

At the Faroese general election on 1 September 2015, Johannesen's party won the election with 25.1% of the votes and he became prime minister. Johannesen himself got 2405 personal votes which was a new Faroese record. He broke the record of Kaj Leo Holm Johannesen from 2011 which was 1967 personal votes.
At the Faroese general election on 8 December 2022 he was reelected, and on 22 December 2022 he was elected prime minister.

Football career 
Aksel V. Johannesen  played football with his hometown club KÍ Klaksvík, mostly as a forward. Although not always an automatic choice for the starting XI, he made his contribution, as KÍ won the Faroese League in 1991 and National cup in 1994 (Johannesen came in as a substitute in 2-1 final victory against B71 Sandur).

Aksel V. Johannesen is also a noted runner, he was national 100 meters champion in 1994. He also played volleyball for Mjølnir, the club of Klaksvík.

Personal life 
He is educated Master of Law from the University of Copenhagen in 2004, and worked as a lawyer in Tórshavn from 2007 until he became an active politician. He is former president of the football club of Klaksvík, Klaksvíkar Ítróttarfelag, where he used to play football in his youth.
He is married to Katrin Apol, with whom he has three children. 

Johannesen is the son of Vilhelm Johannesen, a former Faroese politician, and uncle of Beinir Johannesen, a politician representing the People's Party.

References 

1972 births
Living people
Members of the Løgting
Social Democratic Party (Faroe Islands) politicians
Health ministers of the Faroe Islands
Finance Ministers of the Faroe Islands
KÍ Klaksvík players
Prime Ministers of the Faroe Islands
Faroese sportsperson-politicians
21st-century Danish politicians
People from Klaksvík
Faroese footballers
Association football forwards